Vasiliauskas is the masculine form of a Lithuanian family name. {Polish counterpart: Wasilewski, Russian: Vasilevsky. Its feminine forms  are: Vasiliauskienė (married woman or widow) and Vasiliauskaitė (unmarried woman).

The surname may refer to:

Kazim Vasiliauskas, Lithuanian racing driver
Povilas Vasiliauskas, politician
Justinas Vasiliauskas, rugby player, Lithuanian national team
Augustinas Vasiliauskas, musician, Recipient of the Lithuanian National Prize
Nida Vasiliauskaitė, Lithuanian philosopher and publicist
Šarūnas Vasiliauskas, Lithuanian basketball player
 

Lithuanian-language surnames